The Maurice Seitz House is a house located in southwest Portland, Oregon listed on the National Register of Historic Places.

See also
 National Register of Historic Places listings in Southwest Portland, Oregon

References

External links

Houses on the National Register of Historic Places in Portland, Oregon
Tudor Revival architecture in Oregon
Houses completed in 1925
1925 establishments in Oregon
Portland Historic Landmarks
Southwest Hills, Portland, Oregon